Pain Rudposht (also Romanized as Pā’īn Rūdposht and Pā’īn Rūd Posht; also known as Pā’īn Rūd Posht-e Pā’īn Maḩalleh) is a village in Dehgah Rural District, Kiashahr District, Astaneh-ye Ashrafiyeh County, Gilan Province, Iran. At the 2006 census, its population was 1,109, in 368 families.

References 

Populated places in Astaneh-ye Ashrafiyeh County